Egg soda is a sweet drink made from egg yolk, sweetened condensed milk, and club soda from Southern Vietnam, though it is also consumed in Cambodia. There are variations of this drink, made with different eggs but most commonly used is a quail egg. Since club soda is acidic, adding this to the egg yolk will curdle the protein. The texture of the drink can be described like a custard.

It is often canned and sold at Vietnamese or other Asian supermarkets. Egg soda can also be found freshly made at some Vietnamese restaurants.

See also
 Egg coffee 
 Egg cream
 Eggnog
 List of egg drinks

References

External links

 Video of egg soda being made

Egg dishes
Milk-based drinks
Vietnamese drinks
Cambodian drinks